Sankeng is a railway station on the Taiwan Railways Administration West Coast line located in Ren'ai District, Keelung City, Taiwan.

History
The station was opened on 9 May 2003, as a result of TRA's policy of transforming its railroad lines into MRT-type railroad. The only train that stops at this station is the local train.

Platform layout

Around the station
 Keelung Miaokow Night Market

See also

 List of railway stations in Taiwan

References

External links
TRA Sankeng Station
Taiwan Railways Administration

2003 establishments in Taiwan
Railway stations in Keelung
Railway stations opened in 2003
Railway stations served by Taiwan Railways Administration